Low affinity immunoglobulin gamma Fc region receptor II-a is a protein that in humans is encoded by the FCGR2A gene.

Interactions
FCGR2A has been shown to interact with PIK3R1 and Syk.

See also
 CD32

References

Further reading

External links 
 
 PDBe-KB provides an overview of all the structure information available in the PDB for Human Low affinity immunoglobulin gamma Fc region receptor II-a (FCGR2A)

Clusters of differentiation
Fc receptors